Going Bye Bye is a 1934 American pre-Code comedy short film starring Laurel and Hardy.

Plot
In a packed courtroom, a judge (Harry Dunkinson) thanks spectators Laurel and Hardy for their crucial testimony in helping to convict Butch Long (Walter Long), a notorious and violent criminal. The judge then sentences Butch to life in prison, which prompts Stan to ask, "Aren't you going to hang him?" Infuriated and confined in a straitjacket, Butch turns to Stan and Ollie and threatens the "squealers", vowing that he will escape prison, find them, "break off" their legs, and "wrap 'em around your necks!" Later, outside the courtroom and in their car, Ollie sarcastically repeats Stan's question to the judge about hanging Butch, noting Long's furious reaction and asking, "Couldn't you see that he was annoyed?"

The clearly frightened boys now make plans to move far away, and they advertise in the local newspaper for someone to go with them to share the travel expenses. Unfortunately, the person who responds to their ad happens to be Butch's girlfriend Mary (Mae Busch). Butch in the meantime manages to escape police custody and go to Mary's apartment. Stan and Ollie soon arrive at the apartment as well to meet their prospective traveling companion. When they ring the doorbell, Butch thinks it is probably the cops, so he hides in a large trunk. The trunk gets locked, trapping Butch, who begins yelling for help. Stan and Ollie, completely unaware of who it is, make several inept attempts to free him, including boring holes into trunk. Through one of those holes Butch can see Ollie, and he recognizes him. Frustrated and enraged, the convict tells them to try using a blowtorch to melt the lock. That effort fails as the torch's flame rushes through one of the bored holes and sets the back of the convict's pants on fire. The boys rush out to the apartment building's hallway, get an emergency firehose, return to the room, and then shove the hose's nozzle into another hole, one on top of the trunk. When they turn on the water, the trunk's interior floods and the container quickly breaks apart as Butch emerges. Now freed, Butch exacts his revenge on the hapless duo just before six police officers arrive and drag away the thug. The film now ends with Stan and Ollie perched next to one another on a couch. Through practical effects, they appear to have their legs ripped off and wrapped around their necks. Ollie says, "Well, here's another nice mess you’ve gotten me into." Stan then begins to cry and whimpers, "Well I couldn't help it...".

Cast
 Stan Laurel as Mr. Laurel
 Oliver Hardy as Mr. Hardy
 Walter Long as Butch
 Mae Busch as Mary, Butch's Girlfriend
 Harry Dunkinson as Judge
 Sam Lufkin as Man with Warning

Production notes
 The film is a reworking of a very early Laurel and Hardy silent comedy, Do Detectives Think? and would itself be somewhat reworked eleven years later in their final American film, The Bullfighters.
The characters of Butch and his girlfriend are similar to their original film Any Old Port.

References

External links
 
 

1934 films
1934 comedy films
American black-and-white films
American courtroom films
American films about revenge
Films directed by Charley Rogers
Laurel and Hardy (film series)
1934 short films
American comedy short films
1930s English-language films
1930s American films